The Autonomous Workers' Union (АСТ) was a revolutionary syndicalist organization that was founded in 2011 in Kyiv. At the time of its founding, it included people who had participated in other anarchist, leftist, and trade union initiatives, including the Direct Action student union and the Independent Media Union. Later, bearers of illiberal Marxist views left the organization, which became consisted exclusively of anarchists and libertarian Marxists. As of 2018, the activity of АСТ was terminated.

Activities
A number of ACT activists took an active part in many social campaigns before the organization was founded, including a campaign against the Labor Code, which had been running since 2008. Similar draft labor law reforms were submitted to various presidents and governments, but all were criticized by left-wing activists, and were blocked each time by protests. This experience, together with the experience of the campaign against the Law on Education conducted by the Direct Action trade union, became the impetus for the creation of the ACT.

ACT participated in a campaign against the law on peaceful assembly, which was lobbied by the Yanukovych administration and, if passed, would have complicated peaceful protests. The organization cooperated with the All-Ukrainian Coalition "For Peaceful Protest!", Which demanded the rejection of the relevant "Zakharchenko-Stavniychuk bill." ACT also participated in other actions and campaigns: the campaign against the privatization of the railway, the campaign against pension reform, and the campaign against rising public transport prices, which later grew into a campaign for free travel. The organization participated in anti-clerical actions, supported feminist and anti-discrimination initiatives. Students who were members of the ACT also engaged in protest activities at universities.

The organization repeatedly organized actions of solidarity with Ukrainian, Russian, Kazakh, British, Polish, Turkish, German, Belarusian, and Greek comrades in the international left movement.

ACT was a traditional co-organizer and participant in radical left-wing May Day marches in Kyiv and other cities. It also took part in less radical street protests to protect the interests of employees. ACT members were involved in labor disputes, providing informational and legal assistance to teams and employees who come into conflict with their employers. At the same time ACT was not limited to standard methods, using, in particular, the tactics of direct action.

According to the program documents of the organization, the ACT stood for the positions of class struggle, and their ultimate goal was the elimination of the capitalist system and the construction of a stateless classless society.

ACT during and after Maidan

ACT-Kyiv
At first, ACT-Kyiv did not take any part in the events of Maidan, justifying it by the influence of far-right parliamentary politicians and the presence of a far-right agenda. However, the ACT condemned the beating of students on November 30, and strongly opposed the laws imposed on January 16. It was after the adoption of these laws that many members of the organization individually decided to take part in the Maidan, mainly in humanitarian initiatives (such as shifts in hospitals). But some were on the front line, during the fighting on Hrushevskoho street and the final clashes of the conflict. ACT members supported the occupation of the Ministry of Education by students shortly after Yanukovych's escape.

AST-Kyiv became the first left-wing organization to hold a protest action in Kyiv against the new government.

AST-Kharkiv
AST-Kharkiv took an active part in the local Maidan protests, having more opportunities to integrate into its structure and voice its requirements. The Libertarian Ten, created by the ACT, played a role in ensuring the security of the local Maidan. In the summer of 2014, ACT activists occupied an empty municipal building, turning it into the "Autonomy" social center, which was used to provide temporary housing to internally displaced persons from Donbas and to conduct educational and political activities. But due to a split in the team that took place in the fall of 2014, the cultural center began to operate separately from the local ACT.

Attitude to the situation in Donbas and Crimea
Both ACT cells dissociated themselves from the demonstrations in eastern Ukraine, defining them as far-right and reactionary. In their publications, ACT members pointed to Russian aggression in Ukraine and described the transfer of Crimea as an annexation. The organization opposed the forced mobilization on the territory of Ukraine, as well as the government's attempts to cover up the revocation of political freedoms and the dismantling of elements of the welfare state. The slogans "Against the devaluation of life" and "War will not write anything" became central at the anarchist rally on May 1, 2015, which was held with the participation of ACT.

ACT structure and principles
The Autonomous Workers' Union had no leaders. All decisions are made collectively, by vote or consensus. Positions had an imperative mandate: persons who performed certain duties were elected and recalled in accordance with collective decisions. There were regional and branch unions in the ACT, made up of ACT-Kyiv, ACT-Kharkiv, ACT-Moscow and ACT-Dumka, which united employees of intangible labor.

The organization stated that it did not accept any form of nationalism, chauvinism, racism, discrimination on the grounds of sex or gender, age, sexual or cultural tastes. It supported feminist initiatives and the struggle of oppressed minorities for their rights. ACT refused to cooperate with the state, employers, political parties, religious denominations, right-wing and conservative organizations.

Related projects
Bezpartshkola (BPSh) was an open self-educational project founded by AST, which in 2014 included lectures, seminars and discussions on socio-political and cultural topics for a wide range of students.
Together with the independent student union Direct Action, weekly screenings and discussions of feature and documentary political, acute social and countercultural films were held within the framework of the Libertarian Film Club.
Part of the ACT assets were involved in the editorial board of the countercultural publication Nihilist.
With the participation of ACT members, a publishing cooperative VK17 was established in Kyiv, which published anarchist books.
ACT members collaborated with some sports initiatives united under the name "Proletarian Cultural and Sports Association". In particular, training in rugby and martial arts was held.

Conflicts and criticism
Since 2012, the Autonomous Workers' Union has advocated the political separation of anarchists from the Social Democrats and other party leftists. They criticized not only Stalinist organizations but also other successors of the Bolshevik tradition, including Trotskyists. Subsequently, many Russian leftists, including KRAS and RSD, accused the ACT of Ukrainian nationalism and Russophobia for a number of members of the organization pointing to Russia as the main culprit in the Russo-Ukrainian War and wishing it more defeat than "their" state.

In addition, the ACT has been criticized by Ukrainian nationalist organizations for its anarchist views. In particular, Ukrainian left-wing nationalists accused it of "national nihilism" and Ukrainophobia for denying the right of nations to self-determination and not recognizing the progressive role of the Ukrainian Insurgent Army.

See also
Anarcho-syndicalism
Syndicalism
Revolutionary Confederation of Anarcho-Syndicalists
Workers' Initiative

References

External links 
 Офіційний сайт
 Офіційна група в Фейсбук
 Офіційна група Вконтакті

2011 establishments in Ukraine
2018 disestablishments in Ukraine
Defunct organizations based in Ukraine
Anarchist organizations in Ukraine
Syndicalist trade unions
Trade unions in Ukraine